Madruzzo may refer to:

People with the surname
Carlo Emanuele Madruzzo
Carlo Gaudenzio Madruzzo
Cristoforo Madruzzo
Eriprando Madruzzo
Ludovico Madruzzo

Places
Madruzzo, Trentino

Italian-language surnames